John M. Hunt (1 December 1918 – 23 July 2005) was a geologist, chemist, and oceanographer. He worked at the Woods Hole Oceanographic Institution beginning in 1968. His specialty was petroleum geochemistry, and he wrote the standard textbook Petroleum Geochemistry and Geology.

References 

American oceanographers
American petroleum geologists
1918 births
2005 deaths